The Shreveport Pirates were a minor-league baseball team based from Shreveport, Louisiana. The team played from 1904 to 1910, first in the Southern Association from 1904 to 1907, and in the Texas League from 1908 to 1910.

Major League Players such as Tom Fisher, Bill Grahame and Stub Smith have played for the team. Fisher has also managed the team during his time on the Pirates.

References

Defunct Southern Association teams
Defunct Texas League teams
Defunct minor league baseball teams
Baseball teams established in 1901
Pirates
Professional baseball teams in Louisiana
1901 establishments in Louisiana
1910 disestablishments in Louisiana
Defunct baseball teams in Louisiana
Baseball teams disestablished in 1910